The 1919 Bowling Green Normals football team was an American football team that represented Bowling Green State Normal School (later Bowling Green State University) during the 1919 college football season. In its first season of intercollegiate football, Bowling Green compiled a 0–3 record and was outscored by a total of 28 to 0. Dale Treece was the team captain. 

Bowling Green was founded in 1914, and the fall of 1919 marked the start of an aggressive athletic program led by Professor Beyerman. In September 1919, Raymond Ladd offered his services to lead the program until a coach could be secured. The school had less than 30 men enrolled in the student body for the fall of 1919, and every man who was physically able tried out for the team. The first intercollegiate football game was scheduled for October 3 against Toledo. John Stitt, who had been quarterback at the Case School of Applied Science in 1917, was brought in to coach the team in late September.

The team played its home games at the Ridge Street Athletic Field in Bowling Green, Ohio.

Schedule

References

Bowling Green
Bowling Green Falcons football seasons
College football winless seasons
Bowling Green Normals football